Niangoloko is a department or commune of Comoé Province in southern Burkina Faso. Its capital is the town of Niangoloko. According to the 2019 census the department has a total population of 76,840.

Towns and villages
 Niangoloko	(33,292 inhabitants) (capital)
 Boko	(2,633 inhabitants)
 Dangouindougou	(1,781 inhabitants)
 Diefoula	(1,248 inhabitants)
 Folonzo	(1,618 inhabitants)
 Kakoumana	(1,310 inhabitants)
 Karaborosso	(1,119 inhabitants)
 Kimini	(3,449 inhabitants)
 Koutoura	(2,214 inhabitants)
 Mitieridougou	(2,464 inhabitants)
 Nofesso	(1,838 inhabitants)
 Ouangolodougou	(3,523 inhabitants)
 Tierkora	(1,134 inhabitants)
 Timperba	(2,896 inhabitants)
 Toundoura	(1,105 inhabitants)
 Yendere	(2,851 inhabitants)

References

Departments of Burkina Faso
Comoé Province